Eissporthalle Iserlohn is an arena in Iserlohn, Germany.  It is primarily used for ice hockey and is the home arena of The Iserlohn Roosters. It opened in 1971 and holds 4,999 People

External links 
 

Indoor arenas in Germany
Indoor ice hockey venues in Germany
Iserlohn
Sports venues in North Rhine-Westphalia
Buildings and structures in Märkischer Kreis